John 18:38 is the 38th verse in chapter 18 of the Gospel of John in the New Testament of Christian Bible. It is often referred to as "jesting Pilate" or "What is truth?", of Latin Quid est veritas? In it, Pontius Pilate questions Jesus' claim that he is "witness to the truth" (John 18:37).

Following this statement, Pilate tells the complainant authorities outside that he does not consider Jesus guilty of any crime.

Text

Analysis

The exact intention of Pilate has been subject to debate among scholars, with no firm conclusion. His statement may have been made in jest that the trial was a mockery, or he may have sincerely intended to reflect on the philosophical position that truth is hard to ascertain. The Greek word rendered as "truth" in English translations is "aletheia", which literally means "unconcealed" and connotes sincerity in addition to factuality and reality; whereas Jesus' use of the term appears to indicate absolute, revealed knowledge.

This verse reflects the Christian tradition of the "guiltlessness of Jesus" in Pilate's Court. The innocence of Jesus is important in the Gospel of John, given that it emphasizes Jesus as the Lamb of God.

Note that Jesus, although he does not respond to Pilate's question (perhaps because Pilate "went out again" before giving him a chance to) knows the answer. During his prayer in Gethsemane, Jesus tells God, "Sanctify them through thy truth: thy word is truth." (John 17:17) 

Some commentators have seen significance in the fact that the anagram "Est vir qui adest" ("It is the man who is before you") can be made from the letters of "Quid est veritas". 

In addition to the guiltlessness of Jesus this verse also reflects the rejection of the truth of God: Jesus, the witness to truth was rejected, ignored and condemned.

Literary references
This verse has been widely quoted and alluded to in culture and literature, particularly in that of philosophical nature. While Pilate's question—whether intended philosophically, jestfully, rhetorically, or born of frustration at the lack of a plain answer—is by no means the only incident of someone questioning the nature of truth, it has been drawn upon many times as a significant occurrence thereof.

Francis Bacon uses this musing to open his essay Of Truth, saying that Pilate "would not stay for an answer". He uses this to introduce his theme of truth as an affirmation of faith.

Friedrich Nietzsche wrote of the line and extended praise to Pilate:
"Do I still have to add that in the entire New Testament there is only one solitary figure one is obliged to respect? Pilate, the Roman governor.  To take a Jewish affair seriously - he cannot persuade himself to do that.  One Jew more or less - what does it matter ?... The noble scorn of a Roman before whom an impudent misuse of the word 'truth' was carried on has  enriched the New Testament with the only expression which possesses value - which is its criticism, its annihilation even: 'What is truth?..." (Nietzsche, writing in The Antichrist, §46)

Mikhail Bulgakov fictionally expands on the relationship between Pilate and Jesus in his novel Master and Margarita. Specific reference to John 18:38 comes in Chapter 2 of the novel entitled "Pontius Pilate", in which he asks the very question "What is truth?" to Jesus ("Jeshua Ha-Notsri" - "Jesus of Nazareth" in Hebrew).

J. L. Austin, the ordinary-language philosopher, in a symposium on truth, comments:
'What is truth?' said jesting Pilate, and would not stay for an answer. Pilate was in advance of his time. For 'truth' itself is an abstract noun, a camel, that is, of a logical construction, which cannot get past the eye even of a grammarian. We approach it cap and categories in hand : we ask ourselves whether Truth is a substance (the Truth, the Body of Knowledge), or a quality (something like the colour red, inhering in truths), or a relation ('correspondence'). But philosophers should take something more nearly their own size to strain at. What needs discussing rather is the use, or certain uses, of the word 'true.' In vino, possibly, 'veritas,' but in a sober symposium
'verum.'

In his novella (and play) Home Truths, David Lodge lets the writer Adrian Ludlow quote "What is truth? said jesting Pilate, and would not stay for an answer" when he is interviewed by the journalist Fanny Tarrant, known for her vicious and perhaps not entirely truthful interviews.

In Robert A. Heinlein's novel Stranger in a Strange Land, principal character Jubal Harshaw, in response to Valentine Michael Smith’s query "What is 'truth'?", thinks “('What is Truth?' asked a Roman judge, and washed his hands of a troublesome question. Jubal wished that he could do likewise.)"

See also
Religious views on truth

References

External links

Of truth, part of Francis Bacon's Essays.

New Testament words and phrases
Truth
38
Pontius Pilate